The Divine Life Society (DLS) is a Hindu spiritual organisation and an ashram, founded by Swami Sivananda Saraswati in 1936, at Muni Ki Reti, Rishikesh, India. Today it has branches around the world, the headquarters being situated in Rishikesh. Also, many disciples of Swami Sivananda have started independent organisations in Mauritius, the US, Australia, Canada, Malaysia, South Africa, South America, and Europe.

Aims

Its aim is to disseminate spiritual knowledge in the following ways:

 through publication of books, pamphlets and magazines on the subjects of Yoga and Vedanta
 holding and arranging spiritual conferences and discourses (Satsang)
 establishing training centers for the practice of Yoga
 enabling aspirants to develop their spiritual lives via systematic training in yoga and philosophy
 establishing charitable organisations
 through the preservation of the ancient traditions and cultural practices of India

History
In 1936, after returning from a pilgrimage, Swami Sivananda stayed in an old hut on the banks of the Ganges in Rishikesh.  Other disciples desirous of his company stayed with him in difficult circumstances.  Eventually, he started the Divine Life Society to serve mankind. The King of Tehri Garhwal granted him a plot of land to construct the present day Shivanandashram.  Chidananda Saraswati served as president of the society from August 1963 to 28 August 2008, while Krishnananda Saraswati served as the General-Secretary of the Society in Rishikesh from 1958 until 2001.

Vegetarianism

Sivananda insisted on a strict lacto-vegetarian for moral and spiritual reasons, arguing that "meat-eating is highly deleterious to health". His Divine Life Society thus advocates a vegetarian diet.

Departments

 Sivananda Ashram is the headquarters of the Divine Life Society.
 Yoga-Vedanta Forest Academy trains seekers in the practice of yoga as a general discipline for personal integration as well as for human welfare.
 Yoga-Vedanta Forest Academy Press prints the cultural and spiritual books as well as the journals and other literature of the Divine Life Society.
 Sivananda Publication League is the publishing arm of the Divine Life Society.
 The Free Literature Section freely distributes books and other literature to seekers and aspirants worldwide.
 Sivananda Charitable Hospital renders free medical service to the public and conducts periodical medical relief camps freely.
 Sivananda Home Takes care of food, clothing and medical needs of Destitute Patients

Branches
Branches are found in Australia, Canada, Malaysia, South Africa and Trinidad and Tobago

See also
 Survey of Hindu organisations'References

Further reading
 Sivananda and the Divine Life Society: A Paradigm of the "secularism," "puritanism" and "cultural Dissimulation" of a Neo-Hindu Religious Society, by Robert John Fornaro. Published by Syracuse University, 1969.
 From man to God-man: the inspiring life-story of Swami Sivananda, by N. Ananthanarayanan. Published by Indian Publ. Trading Corp., 1970.
 Swami Sivananda and the Divine Life Society: An Illustration of Revitalization Movement'', by Satish Chandra Gyan. Published by s.n, 1979.
 Swami Sivananda's books

Related links
 The official website of Divine Life Society
 The other official website of Divine Life Society
 Swami Krishnananda, former General Secretary of the Divine Life Society

1936 establishments in India
Ashrams
Hindu organisations based in India
Hindu new religious movements
International Hindu organizations
Organisations based in Dehradun
Organisations based in Uttarakhand
Neo-Vedanta
Religious organizations established in 1936
Religions that require vegetarianism
Rishikesh